Blochmann or Blochman is a surname. Notable people with the surname include:

Elisabeth Blochmann (1892–1972), German educator
Heinrich Blochmann (1838–1878), German iranist in Kolkata
Lawrence Blochman (1900–1975), American writer and translator

See also
Brochmann